Return of the Storks is a 2007 Slovak film directed by Martin Repka. It was Slovakia's submission to the 80th Academy Awards for the Academy Award for Best Foreign Language Film, but was not accepted as a nominee.

See also

Cinema of Slovakia
List of submissions to the 80th Academy Awards for Best Foreign Language Film

References

External links

2007 films
2007 drama films
Slovak drama films